Boualem Benmalek (born 30 January 1989 in Sétif) is an Algerian professional footballer. He is currently NC Magra in the Algerian Ligue Professionnelle 2.

International career
On November 16, 2011, Benmalek was selected as part of Algeria's squad for the 2011 CAF U-23 Championship in Morocco.

References

External links
Ligue Nationale de Football

1989 births
Living people
Algerian footballers
ES Sétif players
Algerian Ligue Professionnelle 1 players
Algeria under-23 international footballers
Algeria youth international footballers
2011 CAF U-23 Championship players
Footballers from Sétif
Association football goalkeepers
AS Aïn M'lila players
21st-century Algerian people